Siegfried II of Querfurt (mid 13th century – 5 May 1310) was Prince-Bishop of Hildesheim from 1279 to 1310.

Biography
Siegfried was from a noble family of Querfurt (which now belongs to Saxony-Anhalt).

He was head of the chapter at the Cathedral of Magdeburg before he was appointed as bishop on 18 July 1279.

He founded the medieval commune of Gronau. This was one part of his defense strategy of the Prince-Bishopric of Hildesheim that he was head of in his role as prince-bishop. Two other parts of this strategy were that he ordered to build a castle in Liebenburg and another one in Ruthe (which now belongs to the municipality of Sarstedt). Both castles were destroyed in the centuries thereafter. In 1302 he bought a castle in Westerhof (which now belongs to the municipality of Kalefeld). In 1310 he bought the County of Dassel in order to enlarge his prince-bishopric.

The dukes of Brunswick and Lunenburg were his major opponents. Additionally, the citizens of Hildesheim attempted to gain independence while he was prince-bishop.

References
Friedrich Wilhelm Ebeling: Die deutschen Bischöfe bis zum Ende des sechzehnten Jahrhunderts. Leipzig 1858, Erster Band, S. 510–512

13th-century German Roman Catholic bishops
14th-century German Roman Catholic bishops
Prince-Bishops of Hildesheim
13th-century births
1310 deaths